Soltanabad (also Romanized as Solţānābād; also known as Sultānābād) is a village in Kermajan Rural District, in the Central District of Kangavar County, Kermanshah Province, Iran. At the 2006 census, its population was 781, in 176 families.

References 

Populated places in Kangavar County